Play in Group C of the 2006 FIFA World Cup began on 10 June 2006 and ended on 21 June. Argentina won the group and advanced to the second round, along with the Netherlands. The two sides tied on points in the standings, but Argentina won the tie-break on goal difference and ended the group in first with the Netherlands in second place. The Ivory Coast and Montenegro failed to advance.

Upon completion of the draw for the tournament, many football pundits remarked that this group appeared to be the "group of death", despite the fact that only Argentina had qualified for the previous World Cup.

Standings

Argentina advanced to play Mexico (runners-up of Group D) in the round of 16.
The Netherlands advanced to play Portugal (winners of Group D) in the round of 16.

Matches
All times local (CEST/UTC+2)

Argentina vs Ivory Coast

Serbia and Montenegro vs Netherlands

Argentina vs Serbia and Montenegro

Netherlands vs Ivory Coast

Netherlands vs Argentina

Ivory Coast vs Serbia and Montenegro

C group
Group
Group
Serbia and Montenegro at the 2006 FIFA World Cup
Ivory Coast at the 2006 FIFA World Cup